Philippe Saurel (born 17 December 1957) is a French politician, mayor of Montpellier between 2014 and 2020.

Political Accomplishments
Chairman of the Supervisory Board of Montpellier University Hospital since December 2014. He was elected Mayor of the City of Montpellier by the Municipal Council on April 5, 2014. President of Montpellier Agglomération and President of Montpellier Méditerranée Métropole since January 2015. Chairman of the Board of Directors of ACM Habitat, Public Housing Office of Montpellier Méditerranée Métropole, since 2016.

References

1957 births
Living people
Mayors of Montpellier
Politicians from Occitania (administrative region)
Socialist Party (France) politicians
Chevaliers of the Légion d'honneur
French dentists
21st-century French politicians